Down in the Boondocks is the second studio album by Billy Joe Royal released in 1965, the same year as his self-titled debut album.

There were three singles released from the album, all reaching the top 40: the title track (#9), "I Knew You When" (#14), and "I've Got to Be Somebody" (#38).  The album also landed on the Pop Albums chart, peaking at No. 96.

Track listing 
All tracks composed by Joe South, except where indicated
 "Down in the Boondocks" 
 "I Knew You When" 
 "My Fondest Memories" 
 "I've Got to Be Somebody"
 "Oh, What a Night" (Marvin Junior, Johnny Funches)
 "Leaning on You"
 "Heartaches and Teardrops" (Marty Cooper, Ray Whitley)
 "Funny How Time Slips Away" (Willie Nelson)
 "Those Railroad Tracks in Between" (Freddy Weller)
 "King of Fools" (Tommy Roe)
 "Steal Away" (Jimmy Hughes)
 "Pollyanna"

References

1965 albums
Billy Joe Royal albums
Columbia Records albums
Albums produced by Joe South